Craig Brewer (born December 6, 1971) is an American filmmaker. His 2005 movie Hustle & Flow won the Audience Award at the 2005 Sundance Film Festival and achieved commercial success, along with an Academy Award for Best Original Song, "It's Hard out Here for a Pimp". He is also known for directing the 2011 remake of Footloose, the 2019 film Dolemite Is My Name and the 2021 film Coming 2 America; the latter two starring Academy Award-nominee Eddie Murphy.

Early life
Brewer is the son of Gail, a teacher, and Walter D. Brewer, an executive who worked for Matson Navigation Co. He is of Irish, English, and Spanish descent. He was born in Newport News, Virginia, where his father was stationed in the Army, and grew up in Vallejo, California. One of his grandparents was Marv Throneberry, a professional baseball player and spokesman for Miller Lite beer.

Career
Hustle & Flow was financed by filmmaker John Singleton, also produced by Stephanie Allain, Preston Holmes and executive produced by Dwight Williams. Singleton was impressed by Brewer's first feature, The Poor & Hungry, shot in Memphis, Tennessee. Ten years after the release of Hustle & Flow, Brewer re-teamed with Terrence Howard and Taraji P. Henson on their acclaimed television series, Empire. The episode he directed, "Fires of Heaven", aired October 7, 2015.

Brewer's subsequent project, Black Snake Moan, began filming in September 2005 and stars Samuel L. Jackson, Christina Ricci, and Justin Timberlake. Black Snake Moan was partially filmed in Stanton, Tennessee. Production completed on Black Snake Moan in October 2005 and it was released on March 2, 2007. His first big-budget film, a remake of the 1984 film, Footloose was released on October 14, 2011 after Brewer and the two stars of the film, Kenny Wormald and Julianne Hough, completed a national press tour promoting the film.

In 2012, Brewer was executive producer of Katy Perry: Part of Me. That same year, Brewer premiered a documentary he directed about Indie Memphis and filmmakers called Indie Origins. In 2014, Brewer was elected President of Indie Memphis for two years. A year later, Brewer released a video made in conjunction with the Memphis Grizzlies on the city's adoration of player Marc Gasol; Brewer himself makes a brief appearance at the beginning of the video.

Brewer is also the creator of $5 Cover, an MTV drama series about Memphis musicians. The 15-episode show was broadcast online and on MTV, and featured Memphis musicians playing themselves and their original songs. Other TV projects include an episode of The Shield and the pilot to Terriers. Brewer returned to directing TV pilots with Boomerang for FOX, starring Felicity Huffman . It was not picked up. In January 2014, Brewer signed a deal with Paramount Television to executive produce, write and direct two TV drama pilots. In late May 2015, one of these shows was revealed to be a television adaptation of the film Urban Cowboy; Brewer wrote the pilot and directed it, but the pilot was not picked up by FOX.

In late February 2013, Brewer's theatrical follow-up to Footloose was announced as Gangster Princess of Beverly Hills, based on the true-life crime escapades of Lisette Lee, a young woman who claimed to be the heiress of Samsung. Brewer will write and direct. A year later, Brewer was also attached to potentially direct a new version of The Idolmaker, with Justin Timberlake producing.

Brewer wrote a draft for Warner Bros.' 2016 film The Legend of Tarzan, directed by David Yates.

In June 2018, Brewer began directing a Netflix feature, Dolemite Is My Name. Based on the life of Rudy Ray Moore, the film stars Academy Award nominee Eddie Murphy as Moore, a '70s comedian who puts up the money to make an action film based on a character from his stand-up material. The film is written by Scott Alexander and Larry Karaszewski. Other cast members include Wesley Snipes, Craig Robinson and Mike Epps. The film was released in 2019.

In January 2019, it was announced that Brewer would direct Eddie Murphy in Coming 2 America. Production began in August 2019. Due to the COVID-19 pandemic closing theaters worldwide the film was released through Amazon Prime Video, on March 5, 2021. The film became a huge success for Amazon, topping the Nielsen ratings ahead of every other TV show or movie on major streaming subscription services.

In December 2021, Deadline broke the news that Brewer would be reteaming with Footloose actor Dennis Quaid in a biopic on the life of African-American country singer Charley Pride entitled American Pride. Quaid will co-produce the film with Brewer and co-star as singer/songwriter "Cowboy" Jack Clement. The film will be written by Empire writer Dianne Houston.

Filmography 

Television

The Shield ("Petty Cash") (TV series) (2008) (director)
Terriers ("Pilot") (TV series) (2010) (director)
Empire ("Fires of Heaven") (TV series) (2015) (director)
Empire ("Sins that Amend") (TV series) (2016) (director)
Empire ("Sound and Fury", "Toil & Trouble, Part I", "Full Circle") (TV series) (2017) (director)
Empire ("Full Circle", "Birds in the Cage", "Of Hardiness is Mother", "The Empire Unpossess'd") (TV series) (2018) (director)
Empire ("Without All Remedy", "The Roughest Day") (TV series) (2019) (director)
Urban Cowboy ("Pilot") (TV series) (did not go to series) (writer/director)
Boomerang ("Pilot") (TV series) (did not go to series) (director)

Online

 $5 Cover (web series for MTV) (2009) (creator/director)

References

External links 

NPR article on Brewer and Hustle
Five Favorite Films with Footloose director Craig Brewer (archive)
Interview on SModcast with Kevin Smith
Director Craig Brewer on His Journey Towards Making Dolemite is My Name (Interview)

1971 births
Living people
21st-century American male writers
21st-century American screenwriters
American male screenwriters
American film producers
American male television writers
American television directors
American television writers
Film directors from Virginia
Film producers from Virginia
People from Newport News, Virginia
Screenwriters from Virginia